Dalwood is a locality in the Ballina Shire of New South Wales, Australia.

References

Localities in New South Wales
Ballina Shire